This is a listing of notable people born in, or notable for their association with, Bangka-Belitung Islands, Indonesia.



A
 Dipa Nusantara Aidit, senior leader of the Communist Party of Indonesia (PKI) (Belitung)
 Eko Maulana Ali,  governor of Bangka Belitung (West Bangka)

B
 Basuki Tjahaja Purnama, governor of Jakarta (Manggar, East Belitung Regency)

D
 Artika Sari Devi, Puteri Indonesia 2004 (Pangkal Pinang)

E
 Erzaldi Rosman Djohan, governor of Bangka Belitung (Pangkal Pinang)

M
 Yusril Ihza Mahendra, politician, former chairman of Crescent Star Party (PBB) (Manggar, East Belitung Regency)

T
 Tjung Tin Jan, politician, United States of Indonesia Senator (Sungai Selan, Central Bangka Regency)

Bangka Belitung